Alonzo Harris may refer to:

Alonzo Harris (American football) (born 1992), American football player
Detective Alonzo Harris, a fictional character in American crime thriller film Training Day